Sally Greene  is a British entrepreneur, theatre impresario, restaurateur and philanthropist. She is known for her restorations of the Old Vic and Criterion theatres in London’s West End, as well the famous jazz venue Ronnie Scott’s. Greene also co-produced Billy Elliott the Musical with Stephen Daldry, and has worked as executive producer for multiple theatre, film and television projects through her production company Greene Light Stage. 

In 2006, Greene received an OBE for services to drama.

Early life and education 
Greene is the daughter of lawyer and amateur playwright Basil Greene.  She initially trained as an actress, before moving backstage as a stage manager. Greene also wrote a theatre column for Tatler in the 1980s.

Greene attended the Guildhall School of Music and Drama.

Career 
Greene’s career in theatre began with the restoration of the Richmond Theatre. She bought the lease in 1987 before renegotiating it into a charitable trust with the local authority funding the restoration of the building.

In 1992 Greene set up the Criterion Trust on a similar business plan, after which the theatre went under a complete restoration.

In 1998, the Old Vic Theatre which is among Britain’s oldest theatres, was in talks for development as an alternative venue, with speculation that it might become a nightclub or bingo hall, leading to an appeal by Culture Secretary Chris Smith.

Greene formed The Old Vic Theatre Trust, which enlisted figures like Alex Bernstein and Stephen Daldry. The Trust bought the building, offering an initial payment of £1.5 million, which was later supplemented by a further £2 million to transfer the ownership from the previous owner Ed Mirvish into the charitable trust. In 2003 she formed the Old Vic Theatre Company. In 1994 Greene founded Greene Light Stage, which she runs alongside CEO and Producer Rebecca Quigley. The company has been involved in over 100 shows including Billy Elliott the Musical with Stephen Daldry. The show first performed at the Victoria Palace Theatre, in 2005. In 2007 she launched Greene Light Films, which produces films and short films and made its first venture into television production in 2019.

Greene owns prominent jazz venue Ronnie Scott’s Jazz Club in Soho. Together with philanthropist Michael Watt, she took over from Pete King in 2005, and facilitated a complete refurbishment.

Greene also owns No. Fifty Cheyne, opened in 2004 as the Cheyne Walk Brasserie in Chelsea and relaunched in 2019 under the new name.

Greene is a Trustee at the Old Vic Theatre Trust, the Criterion Theatre Trust, Greene Light Stage, Ronnie Scott’s Charitable Foundation, and the London Music Fund.

Work

Theatre 

 Billy Elliot: The Musical (producer)

Film 

 2007 Ruby Blue (executive producer)
 2011 Hunky Dory (executive producer)
 2014 Desert Dancer (executive producer)

Television 
Planned adaptation of the life of Dame Joan and Jackie Collins (executive producer)

Personal life 
Greene is married to British property developer Robert Bourne.

External links

References 

Living people
British women in business
Officers of the Order of the British Empire
Year of birth missing (living people)
Alumni of the Guildhall School of Music and Drama